Loureiro may refer to:

People
Artur Loureiro (1853–1932), Portuguese painter
Bruno Loureiro (born 1989), Portuguese professional footballer
Claudio Loureiro, Brazilian advertising executive and entrepreneur
Cleber Santana Loureiro (1981–2016), Brazilian professional footballer
Daniel Pedrosa Loureiro (born 1996), Spanish footballer
Fábio de Souza Loureiro (born 1980), former Brazilian footballer
Felipe Jorge Loureiro (born 1977), Brazilian football coach and former footballer
João de Loureiro (1717–1791), Portuguese Jesuit missionary and botanist
João Loureiro (born 1963), President of the Board of the Portuguese football club Boavista FC, 2013–2018
José Jorge Loureiro (1791–1860), Portuguese soldier and politician
Kiko Loureiro (born 1972), Brazilian heavy metal guitarist
Luís Loureiro (born 1976), Portuguese former footballer and coach
Luís Miguel Loureiro, Portuguese state television journalist
Manel Loureiro, Spanish author
Miguel Loureiro (born 1996), Spanish footballer
Oswaldo Loureiro (1932–2018), Brazilian film and television actor
Valentim Loureiro (born 1938), Portuguese politician, former football chairman of Boavista FC

Places
 Loureiro (Oliveira de Azeméis), a civil parish in the municipality of Oliveira de Azeméis, Portugal
 Loureiro, a civil parish in the municipality of Peso da Régua, Portugal

Other
 Loureiro (grape), a grape variety

Portuguese-language surnames